Schoolly D is the self-titled debut album by rapper Schoolly D. The album was released on Schoolly D Records in 1985 and in 1990 on Jive Records, and was produced by Schoolly D and DJ Code Money. It features three singles: "Put Your Filas On", "P.S.K. What Does It Mean?" and "Gucci Time".

The album cover featured drawings of a b-boy set against a yellow background. The speech bubbles used proxies for swear words, such as "sheet" and "flucking".

The latter was sampled in E-40's song "Stilettos & Jeans" featuring Bobby V, taken from his 2010 album Revenue Retrievin': Night Shift.

The album is considered to be the predecessor of gangster rap and a major influence on the first albums of Ice-T and Public Enemy as well as an influence and sample source for Beastie Boys and countless others.

Reception

Simon Reynolds of Melody Maker described the debut in 1986 as "the most extreme hardcore hip-hop record I have ever encountered." and that "It is so far from r'n'b and from funk, so far from ingratiating pleasantness, that the only comparisons I can think of are white ones, groups like the Swans or Killing Joke – precision machine music, a pop abattoir, it can rightly be considered avant-garde." Reynolds went on to state that the strongest track was "P.S.K. (What Does It Mean)" and that "Put Your Filas On" was "another standout."

Track listing
Note: the tracks "Maniac" and "Gangster Boogie" are included in the UK cassette release.
"I Don't Like Rock & Roll" (5:56)
"Put Your Filas On" (7:16)
"Free Style Rapping" (6:52)
"P.S.K. What Does It Mean?" (6:32)
"Gucci Time" (6:10)
"Free Style Cutting" (5:16)

References

Sources
 

Schoolly D albums
1985 debut albums
Jive Records albums
Self-released albums